Bear River City is a city in Box Elder County, Utah, United States. The population was 877 at the 2020 census, up from the 2010 figure of 853. Bear River became a city under state law near the end of 2000. Although current state law requires a minimum population of 1000 for cities, Bear River City remains a city.

A group first settled Bear River City from Brigham City in 1866. The city took its name from the nearby Bear River.

Demographics

As of the census of 2000, there were 750 people, 226 households, and 195 families in the town. The population density was 477.5 people per square mile (184.4/km). There were 233 housing units at an average density of 148.4 per square mile (57.3/km). The racial makeup of the town was 96.27% White, 0.27% Native American, 2.27% from other races, and 1.20% from two or more races. Hispanic or Latino of any race were 3.87% of the population.

There were 226 households, out of which 46.9% had children under the age of 18 living with them, 78.8% were married couples living together, 6.6% had a female householder with no husband present, and 13.3% were non-families. 12.4% of all households were made up of individuals, and 7.1% had someone living alone who was 65 years or older. The average household size was 3.32, and the average family size was 3.64.

In the town, the age distribution of the population shows 36.7% under 18, 8.0% from 18 to 24, 25.6% from 25 to 44, 19.3% from 45 to 64, and 10.4% who were 65 years of age or older. The median age was 30 years. For every 100 females, there were 110.1 males. For every 100 females aged 18 and over, there were 100.4 males.

The median income for a household in the town was $52,212, and the median income for a family was $55,833. Males had a median income of $40,417 versus $24,821 for females. The per capita income was $17,296. None of the population or families were below the poverty line.

Geography
According to the United States Census Bureau, the town has a total area of 1.6 square miles (4.1 km), all land.

Major landmarks

Schools
In 1912, the rapidly expanding Box Elder School District constructed a six-room elementary school in Bear River City. The building underwent a seven-classroom addition in 1999 before remodeling again in 2007. The latest remodeling to the school added new classrooms (for the fifth graders who had been in portables), a new bathroom, and a new library. Century Elementary holds approximately 800 students.

Churches
There is one church that is owned by the Church of Jesus Christ of Latter-day Saints.

Parks
The town park is located east of the church. It includes two playing fields, a playground, a small rodeo arena, an outdoor stage, a volleyball court, and a small shop used on special occasions.  The town park is cared for by a local family.

Historical buildings
There are two buildings over 100 years old - an old town hall that was formerly a post office, and an old shop.  There is an original pioneer log cabin, probably built in the 1850s, which serves as a museum and sits within the boundaries of the town park. This museum can be visited by appointment. At least one home on the corner northeast of the town park was built on remnants of the original Bear River Fort.

Retail locations
The Country Archer's, usually called The Little Store by locals, is the only retail shop.

Government buildings
The current post office is the third one in Bear River City. The original post office became the old town hall, and the second burned down.

See also

 List of cities and towns in Utah

References

External links

 

Populated places established in 1866
Cities in Box Elder County, Utah
Cities in Utah
1866 establishments in Utah Territory
Bear River (Great Salt Lake)